Barronopsis barrowsi is a species of funnel weaver in the spider family Agelenidae. It is found in Canada, the United States, the Bahamas and Hispaniola.

References

Agelenidae
Articles created by Qbugbot
Spiders described in 1934
Arthropods of the Dominican Republic
Spiders of the United States
Spiders of the Caribbean